The 2013 Victorian Football League season was the 132nd season of the Victorian Football Association/Victorian Football League Australian rules football competition. The premiership was won by  who defeated  by 21 points in the Grand Final.

League membership and affiliations
Prior to the 2013 season,  ended its ten-year reserves affiliation with the Bendigo Football Club. Essendon began fielding its own reserves team in the VFL, and Bendigo continued to contest the VFL as a stand-alone senior team.

Foxtel Cup
The top two non-AFL clubs from the 2012 VFL season – Port Melbourne and Werribee – competed in the 2013 Foxtel Cup. Werribee progressed the further of the two teams, losing its semi-final against WAFL club East Fremantle.

Premiership season
Source: VFL Season 2013 Results

Round 1

Round 2

Round 3

Round 4

Round 5

State Game

 Report

Round 6

Round 7

Round 8

Round 9

Round 10

Round 11

Round 12

Round 13

Round 14

Round 15

Round 16

Round 17

Round 18

Round 19

Ladder

Finals

Qualifying and Elimination Finals

Semi-finals

Preliminary Finals

Grand Final

Awards
The J. J. Liston Trophy was won by Mitch Hallahan, Jordan Schroder and Steve Clifton, who all polled 17 votes. It was Clifton's second Liston Trophy.
The Frosty Miller Medal was won by Dean Galea (Port Melbourne), who kicked 55 goals during the home-and-away season. Michael Lourey (Frankston) officially finished second with 54 goals; he actually kicked 55 goals, the same number as Galea, but one was annulled as a result of the headcount in Round 14. Including finals, the leading goalkicker for the season was Ben Warren (Werribee), who finished with 59 goals, one goal more than Galea.
The Fothergill-Round Medal was won by Kane Lambert (Northern Blues), who averaged 26 possessions a game and kicked 21 goals in season 2013.
The top two non-AFL clubs – Box Hill and Williamstown – qualified for the 2014 Foxtel Cup tournament.
The Development League premiership was won by Williamstown. In the Grand Final, played at North Port Oval on 14 September, Williamstown 11.19 (85) defeated Box Hill 12.12 (84) by one point; scores were level at 84 apiece when time expired, and Williamstown scored the winning behind after seven minutes of golden point extra time.

See also 
 List of VFA/VFL premiers
 Australian Rules Football
 Victorian Football League
 Australian Football League
 2013 AFL season

References

External links
AFL Victoria website
Official VFL website

Victorian Football League seasons
VFL